Kedayan River is a tributary of the Brunei River which flows through the capital of Brunei, Bandar Seri Begawan.

History 
On 22 October 2017, the Taman Mahkota Jubli Emas public park was officially opened. It was part of the Sungai Kedayan Eco-Corridor Project which aims to redevelop the area. The consequence of this project caused Kampong Sungai Kedayan, one of the oldest village in the area, to be demolished.

See also 

 List of rivers of Brunei

Rivers of Brunei

References